Troubleshooter was a British reality television series, produced and shown by the BBC, focusing on experienced business leaders visiting and advising small and often struggling UK businesses.

It first aired in 1990 with Sir John Harvey-Jones, formerly of ICI. After the series won a BAFTA, Harvey-Jones decided that he didn't want to become a television personality, after one newspaper called him the "most famous industrialist since Isambard Kingdom Brunel."

The greatest achievement of the Troubleshooter programmes was to make business management a popular discussion subject in the homes of millions of British people, and to provide a role model for people wanting to enter business.

A follow up series titled Troubleshooter - Back in Business aired in the year 2000 and saw Sir John return to companies featured in the original series from a decade before. In that time there had been a number of changes, Tri-ang toys had been unable to turn its fortunes around and its UK factory had been demolished. Morgan Motor Company, where previously Sir John had encountered great resistance, had in fact made many of the changes he suggested.

The series was revived a decade later in 2004 under the stewardship of Gerry Robinson, under the title I'll Show Them Who's Boss!'

Format

The premise of the show is pretty simple: struggling small British business needs help, is offered free advice by former plc-level director; advice often given over number of months is then edited into 1hour duration television show.

However, the reason that it made Harvey-Jones Britain's most notable and public business person was the fact that he engaged both the audience and the company on a human level. By both observing key issues (Harvey-Jones was always very focused on markets and customers first, and then systematic efficient production secondly, focused around people and responsibility), and then asked simple questions to confirm his view or see if the management actually saw the problem.

Production
After originally approaching companies to produce the first series, the BBC production team for the subsequent series were overwhelmed by applications from various British businesses and enterprises. This was in part for the quality of consultation that Harvey-Jones gave, but also for the publicity, which often resulted in an immediate revival for the company through increased sales.

After selecting a breadth of companies, industries and situations, Harvey-Jones and executive producer Richard Reisz would review the applications to choose the selected applicants. Harvey-Jones would nominally only have access to any published accounts, management provided plans, and any items of press and media that could be found, before engaging the company.

The period of consultation was given over a period of at least three months per company, resulting in the third series requiring Harvey-Jones to have reserved dates in his diary for 50weeks of the year: the major reason he gave up the programme, to concentrate on his charitable activities and family.

The original six show proved so popular, that Harvey-Jones was contractually engaged for a second series of six show, and signed on to a further three series of seven shows each - the maximum Harvey-Jones would agree to sign-on for.

Harvey-Jones style
At its peak, Troubleshooter gained 3million viewers per episode. This was in great part for Harvey-Jones personable, frank and straightforward style, with judgements given through his own manic cackling style:
You are being killed by slow strangulation
The situation is barmy and intolerable
It is possible to break through but only if you charge the guns

Organisations featured included Morgan Motor Company, Copella apple juice and Triang toys, where Harvey-Jones put his finger on the problems they faced or in some cases had created, and pointed the way to success. Sometimes they followed his advice, such as at Copella, and sometimes, notably at Morgan, he was met with absolute resistance.

Businesses and organisations featured
Series 1
Apricot Computers
Churchill China
Copella Fruit Juices
Morgan Motor Company
Shropshire Health Authority
Tri-ang toys

Series 2
Bradford Hospitals Trust
Charles Letts
Double Two (Wakefield Shirt Group)
Norton Motorcycles
South Yorkshire Police
Tolly Cobbold

Publications

I’ll Show Them Who’s Boss!
Trying to revive the series in light of the rise of reality television, in 2004 the BBC engaged former Allied-Domecq CEO Gerry Robinson. In deference to Harvey-Jones, Robinson insisted that the show be given a different name, which was agreed on as  I'll Show Them Who's Boss. Now co-produced by the Open University. The concept was that he'd go into struggling businesses and try to turn them round through advice and mentoring.

References

Similar programmes
 Badger or Bust Mary Queen of Shops Gordon Ramsay's series Ramsay's Kitchen Nightmares, Kitchen Nightmares and Hotel Hell Get Your Act Together with Harvey Goldsmith''

External links

BBC Television shows
1990 British television series debuts
1993 British television series endings
1990s British reality television series